Emanoil Hașoti (14 September 1932 – 3 July 1993) was a Romanian football forward and a manager.

Club career
Emanoil Hașoti was born on 14 September 1932 in Kavarna, Kingdom of Romania in a family of aromanians which were forced to leave the town in 1940 after the Treaty of Craiova in which Romania allowed the Kingdom of Bulgaria to retake the Southern Dobruja area. His family settled in Mangalia where in 1950 at age 20, Hașoti started to play amateur level football at local club, Recolta. After two years, however, several families, including his, were ordered to relocate from Mangalia, choosing to go in Sibiu but Emanoil who was already a footballer was still able to play, for a short while at Ș.N. Constanța, between 1952 and 1953, however after a year, Sibiu was set as a mandatory residence for his family, so Hașoti was forced to play football only in the city, at Independența. In 1954, the decision of displacement and forced residence was lifted, so Emanoil's family and relatives could return home but he remained at Independența Sibiu until 1955 when he was brought by coach Silviu Ploeșteanu at Steagul Roșu Brașov in Divizia B, helping the team promote to Divizia A where he made his debut on 25 August 1957 in a 4–3 away victory against Locomotiva București. He remained at Steagul until the end of his career, the highlights of this period being a second place in the 1959–60 Divizia A season and the winning of the 1960–61 Balkans Cup in which he played all the minutes in all the games. He made his last Divizia A appearance on 8 May 1966 in a 2–0 loss against Farul Constanța, having a total of 194 matches played and 32 goals scored in the competition, also he has a total of 11 matches and one goal scored in the Balkans Cup and 7 games with one goal scored in the Inter-Cities Fairs Cup, including a appearance in a 4–2 victory against Espanyol Barcelona.

International career
Emanoil Hașoti played three games at international level for Romania, making his debut under coach Augustin Botescu in a 2–0 away loss against Czechoslovakia at the 1960 European Nations' Cup qualifiers. His other two games for the national team were two friendlies against Turkey, both of them being victories. Hașoti also played two games for Romania's Olympic team.

Managerial career
Emanoil Hașoti started his coaching career at Steagul Roșu Brașov where he coached juniors, afterwards becoming head coach at Divizia B team, Portul Constanța in 1968, moving to Farul Constanța in the middle of the 1969–70 Divizia A season where he worked as an assistant of Robert Cosmoc.
After two years and a half as Cosmoc's assistant he became head coach for the 1972–73 Divizia A season in which the club finished on the 8th position and in the following season he helped the club finish on the 4th position. He was Farul's coach on several occasions, including helping the club earn two promotions from Divizia B to Divizia A, also Hașoti is the coach that in 1982 gave Gheorghe Hagi his debut in professional football. He also coached at Farul's youth center and for a half of year he was coach at Divizia B club, Unirea Slobozia. Emanoil Hașoti has a total of 196 Divizia A games as a manager, all of them at Farul, consisting of 68 victories, 46 draws and 82 losses.

Death
Emanoil Hașoti died on 3 July 1993 at age 60 in his home from Constanța.

Honours

Player
FC Brașov
Divizia A runner-up: 1959–60
Divizia B: 1956
Balkans Cup: 1960–61

Manager
Farul Constanța
Divizia B: 1980–81, 1987–88

Notes

References

External links

Emanoil Hașoti manager profile at Labtof.ro

1932 births
1993 deaths
Romanian people of Aromanian descent
Aromanian sportspeople
Romanian footballers
Olympic footballers of Romania
Romania international footballers
Association football forwards
Liga I players
Liga II players
FC Brașov (1936) players
Romanian football managers
FCV Farul Constanța managers
AFC Unirea Slobozia managers